Hell is EP by American indie pop band The Pains of Being Pure at Heart, released on November 13, 2015, via their own label, Painbow Records.

Track listing
"Hell" – 3:52
"Ballad of the Band" (Felt cover) – 2:50
"Laid" (James cover) – 2:50

References

2015 EPs